Recycled Youth Vol. 1 is the sixth studio album by American rock band Never Shout Never. The album features tracks previously released throughout the years.

Track listing

References

2015 albums
Never Shout Never albums
Warner Records albums